Skyper is a building complex in the Bahnhofsviertel district of Frankfurt, Germany. The tallest of the three buildings is a 38-storey,  skyscraper. Its quadrant-shaped silhouette is a distinctive part of the Frankfurt cityscape. 
 
Completed in 2004, the tower is linked by a  glass atrium to a neo-classical villa dating from 1915. The villa is listed as a building of historical importance and once belonged, along with the site as a whole, to the Philipp Holzmann construction group, which used the property as its corporate head office. A residential and commercial building with 52 one- to three-room apartments and ground-floor retail space completes the ensemble.

The plans for the €480 million project originated from Frankfurt architects JSK, who were commissioned by Holzmann AG. With building approval granted, the architects subsequently realised their plans on behalf of general contractors ABG and the new owner, DekaBank, which had purchased the building for an open real estate fund of its real estate subsidiary, Deka Immobilien. Following completion in 2005, DekaBank moved into offices on the lower floors as the main tenant. The higher floors of the building are occupied by well-known names such as HSBC and Houlihan Lokey.

Skyper has been owned since 2006 by an investment company belonging to the Swiss banking group UBS.

See also
 List of tallest buildings in Frankfurt
 List of tallest buildings in Germany
 List of tallest buildings in the European Union
 List of tallest buildings in Europe

References

External links
 Official Skyper website (German)
 Skyper, project budget 238 Mio. EUR

Buildings and structures completed in 2004
Skyscrapers in Frankfurt
Bankenviertel
Skyscraper office buildings in Germany
Residential skyscrapers in Germany